Niger is divided into eight regions (French: régions; singularrégion), each of which is named after its capital.

Current regions

Additionally, the national capital, Niamey, comprises a special capital district.

Current administrative structure
Each of Niger's regions are subdivided into departments and communes. As of 2005, there were 36 départements, divided into 265 communes, 122 cantons and 81 groupements. The latter two categories cover all areas not covered by urban communes (population over 10000) or rural communes (total population 13 million), and are governed by the department, whereas communes have had elected councils and mayors since 1999.  Additional semi-autonomous subdivisions include sultanates, provinces and tributaries (tribus).  The Nigerien government estimates there are an additional 17000 villages administered by rural communes, while there are a number of quartiers (boroughs  or neighborhoods) administered by urban communes.

Restructuring
Prior to the devolution program of 1999–2006, the regions were styled as departments. The current departments used to be called arrondissements.

1992 division
The department of Tillabéri was created in 1992, when Niamey Region (then called "department") was split, with the areas immediately outside Niamey renamed as the  capital district.

Historical evolution
Prior to independence, Niger was divided into sixteen cercles as second-level administrative divisions: Agadez, Birni N'Konni, Dogondoutchi, Dosso, Filingué, Gouré, Madaoua, Magaria, Maradi, N'Guigmi, Niamey, Tahoua, Téra, Tessaoua, Tillabéry, and Zinder. Their capitals had the same names as the cercle.

After independence, the 31 December 1961 Law of territorial organization created 31 circonscriptions. The 16 colonial cercles continued to exist, and served as a level of division above these circonscriptions. Four cercles (Dogondoutchi, Filingué, N'Guigmi, and Téra) had only one circonscription. The Law of August 14, 1964 then reorganized the country into seven departments, adopting the French second-level administration naming system, in contrast to neighbor Mali, which retained the colonial cercles and regions.

See also
Departments of Niger
Communes of Niger
Geography of Niger
ISO 3166-2:NE for the region codes under the ISO 3166-2 standard.
List of FIPS region codes (M-O) for the department codes under the FIPS 10-4 standard.

References

 
Subdivisions of Niger
Regions, Niger
Niger 1
Geography of Niger
Niger
Niger, Regions
Niger geography-related lists